Blepephaeus varius is a species of beetle in the family Cerambycidae. It was described by Heller in 1898. It is known from Sulawesi.

References

Blepephaeus
Beetles described in 1898